Belmont railway station serves the village of Belmont in the London Borough of Sutton in south London. The station is located on the Epsom Downs line and is in Travelcard Zone 5. It is  down the line from  measured via West Croydon.
It is the closest station to the Royal Marsden Hospital, which is just under half a mile away. On 19 January 2023, Sutton Council were granted £14,121,979 from the government to add a turnback siding to the south of the station to increase capacity to let services run at 4 tph instead of the current 2 tph service patten.

History 
The station was opened by the London, Brighton and South Coast Railway on 22 May 1865, as part of the Epsom Downs branch line. The branch was originally laid as double track because of the race traffic, and was electrified on 17 June 1928.  A modern CLASP (pre-fabricated concrete) building was erected in the 1970s (this has since been demolished and cleared away). The branch was singled in 1982 and all trains use the former down platform. The Up platform still exists however. The station itself has a ticket machine, cycle storage huts and a shelter for passengers to wait in during rain.

The station was originally named 'California', and was changed to 'Belmont' on 1 October 1875.

Services 
All services at Belmont are operated by Southern using  EMUs.

The typical off-peak service in trains per hour is:
 2 tph to  via 
 2 tph to 

Prior to May 2018, the station was served by an hourly service on weekdays and Saturdays only, with no Sunday service. In May 2018, a half-hourly service was introduced on all days of the week.

Connections 
London Buses routes 80, 280, S1, S3, S4 and non-TfL routes 420 and 820 serve the station.

References

External links 

Map of Mole Valley lines
The Epsom Downs branch website

Railway stations in the London Borough of Sutton
Former London, Brighton and South Coast Railway stations
Railway stations in Great Britain opened in 1865
Railway stations served by Govia Thameslink Railway